Kuleshovka is a rural locality (a selo) in Sergeyevskoye Rural Settlement, Podgorensky District, Voronezh Oblast, Russia. The population was 284 as of 2010. There are 3 streets.

Geography 
Kuleshovka is located 8 km southeast of Podgorensky (the district's administrative centre) by road. Golubin is the nearest rural locality.

References 

Rural localities in Podgorensky District